Hulterstad is a small coastal town on the southeastern part of the island of Öland, Sweden.  Hulterstad is situated at the eastern fringe of the Stora Alvaret, a limestone pavement habitat which hosts a diversity of rare plants and has been designated a World Heritage Site by UNESCO.  Hulterstad is the municipal government center for this district and central records for centuries were kept at the Hulterstad Church.  Significant gravefields and a Viking stone burial ship structure are located immediately south of Hulterstad.  To the north is located the village of Alby, where a mesolithic village of early human settlement has been found, and to the south is the Ottenby Nature Reserve.  Across the alvar to the west is the village of Gettlinge.

Notable people
 Anna Agnér (1896–1977) Swedish visual artist

References

Populated places in Kalmar County
Öland